The 1980 United States Senate election in Hawaii took place on November 4, 1980.

Incumbent Democratic U.S Senator Daniel Inouye won re-election to a fourth term in yet another landslide, despite the national 'Reagan Revolution' and the state's very narrow margin of victory for Jimmy Carter in the concurrent presidential election.

Democratic primary

Candidates
 Daniel Inouye, incumbent Senator
 John P. Fritz, candidate for State House in 1976 and 1978
 Kamuela Price, candidate for Senate in 1976

Results

Republican primary

Candidates
 Floyd Bernier-Nachtwey, People's Party candidate for Senate in 1974
 Cooper Brown
 Dan Dew
 Lawrence I. Weisman

Results

General election

Results

See also 
 1980 United States Senate elections

References 

Hawaii
1980
1980 Hawaii elections
Daniel Inouye